Zawada  is a village in the administrative district of Gmina Turawa, within Opole County, Opole Voivodeship, in south-western Poland. 

The village has a population of 1,200.

References

Zawada